Vineeth Kumar is an Indian actor and director in Malayalam cinema. He came into the industry as child artist in the 1988 movie Padippura. His directorial debut Ayal Njanalla was released in 2015.

Early life
Vineeth Kumar was born in Payangadi, Kannur. He has a brother and a sister. He had his primary education from Koodali Higher Secondary School, Government Brennen College, Thalassery and graduated in Maths by correspondence from Academy Of Mathematics. He won 'Kala Prathibha' title at the Kerala School Kalolsavam at the age of 11 when he was a sixth-standard student from the Mele Chovva school in Kannur. He was the youngest to be chosen as 'Kala Pratibha' at school kalolsavam.

Personal life

He married Sandhya on 19 August 2009. The couple has two daughters.

Prizes and awards
 1989 - Kerala State Film Award for Best Child Artist for Oru Vadakkan Veeragatha
 'Kala Prathiba' title at Kerala School Kalolsavam

Filmography

Films

As director

References

External links
 

Male actors from Kannur
Male actors in Malayalam cinema
Indian male film actors
Living people
20th-century Indian male actors
21st-century Indian male actors
Malayalam film directors
Film directors from Kerala
University of Calicut alumni
Year of birth missing (living people)